Loud Hailer is the eleventh and final studio album by guitarist Jeff Beck, released on 15 July 2016 on Atco Records.  It would be Beck's final solo album, almost seven years before his death on 10 January 2023.

Track listing
All tracks written by Jeff Beck, Carmen Vandenberg and Rosie Bones, except where noted.

"The Revolution Will Be Televised" – 3:53
"Live in the Dark" – 3:47
"Pull It" (Jeff Beck, Filippo Cimatti) – 2:09
"Thugs Club" – 5:15
"Scared for the Children" – 6:07
"Right Now" – 3:57
"Shame" – 4:40
"Edna" (Jeff Beck) – 1:03
"The Ballad of the Jersey Wives" – 3:50
"O.I.L. (Can't Get Enough of That Sticky)" – 4:41
"Shrine" – 5:47

Personnel
Jeff Beck – electric guitar
Carmen Vandenberg – electric guitar 
Rosie Bones – vocals
Davide Sollazzi – drums
Giovanni Pallotti – bass

Reception
Although initially charting in the top 50 in many countries and receiving a fair amount of record company backing, the album quickly moved down the charts in the weeks following its release, and sales were disappointing. By 2018, Beck had changed personnel for touring and was utilizing Jimmy Hall, Vinnie Colaiuta, and bassist Rhonda Smith.

Charts

References

2016 albums
Jeff Beck albums
Atco Records albums